Amiret Touazra is a town and commune in the Monastir Governorate, Tunisia. It has  inhabitants in 2014.

Geographical location 

The Municipality of Amiret Touazra is located in the eastern center of Tunisia and is administratively affiliated with the Monastir Governorate. It is bordered to the north by Beni Hassen and Al Ghnada, south by Amiret El Fhoul, west of Boumerdes and east of Amiret El Hojjaj. It consists of two pillars: the northern parity and the southern parallel, and fourteen residential neighborhoods.

The area of urbanization is revised since 1999. Of this, 145.5 hectares are designated for housing. The current area covers 29.5 hectares and covers three major districts: Al Houichet, Al Smiret and Al Khor.

See also
List of cities in Tunisia

References

Populated places in Monastir Governorate
Communes of Tunisia